Sannavur (North) is a village in the Ariyalur taluk of Ariyalur district, Tamil Nadu, India.

Demographics 

 census, Sannavur (North) had a total population of 1497 with 729 males and 768 females.

References 

Villages in Ariyalur district